San Biagio is a romanesque-gothic style Roman Catholic church. It was erected during the 14th century in the town of Montecatini Val di Cecina, province of Pisa, in the region of Tuscany, Italy.

History
The church was erected in 1356 under the patronage of Ugolino Guducci and Ciullo Barletti. It was consecrated in 1361. In 1421 the parish church of Gabbreto, then in ruins, was transferred along with its baptistry to San Biagio. The bell tower was built between 1463 and 1467. In addition the choir was frescoed by an anonymous Sienese painter commissioned by Nicola Nieri of Montecatini.

Between 1514 and 1576, construction of canon's quarters led to sealing of the original facade. Flanking the main altar are two marble angels, called , attributed to Mino da Fiesole. In the niches above the choir are two terracotta statues by the studio of Della Robbia, depicting Saints Blaise and Sebastian.

References

Churches completed in 1361
14th-century Roman Catholic church buildings in Italy
Romanesque architecture in Tuscany
Churches in the province of Pisa